Balázs Bese (born 22 January 1999) is a Hungarian football player. He plays for Szentlőrinc.

Club career
He made his NB I debut for Budafok on 27 February 2021 in a game against Kisvárda.

On 30 July 2022, Bese signed with Szentlőrinc.

International career
Bese represented Hungary at the 2021 UEFA European Under-21 Championship. Hungary lost all three group games and was eliminated, with Bese allowing 11 goals.

Career statistics
.

References

External links
 

1999 births
Footballers from Budapest
21st-century Hungarian people
Living people
Hungarian footballers
Hungary youth international footballers
Hungary under-21 international footballers
Association football goalkeepers
MTK Budapest FC players
Budaörsi SC footballers
Vasas SC players
Budafoki LC footballers
Szentlőrinci SE footballers
Nemzeti Bajnokság I players
Nemzeti Bajnokság II players